Zhang Xin (born 23 May 1992) is a Chinese professional footballer who plays as a midfielder for Shanghai Shengli. She studied in Tongji University.

International goals

References

Living people
1992 births
Chinese women's footballers
China women's international footballers
Footballers at the 2020 Summer Olympics
Olympic footballers of China
Women's association football midfielders